Jubb al-Shami is a hamlet east of Homs.  According to the Central Bureau of Statistics (CBS), its population was 35 in 2004. The inhabitants lived in five households.

References

External links
 Wikimapia
 Panoramio

Populated places in Homs District